Kethepally is a Village and one of the Mandals in the Nalgonda district of India.

References 
Villages in Nalgonda district